Roy Hilton White (born December 27, 1943) is an American former professional baseball player and coach. He played his entire career in Major League Baseball as an outfielder for the New York Yankees between 1965 and 1979. With the Yankees, he won two championships in 1977 and '78, both over his hometown Los Angeles Dodgers.

Baseball career
White, a switch hitter, was named to 2 All Star teams in 1969 and in 1970. In , he set an American League record for most sacrifice flies in a season with 17. He played on two World Series championship teams, in 1977 and 1978 and a third American League pennant winner in 1976.

Career statistics
In a 15-year major league career, White played in 1,881 games, accumulating 1,803 hits in 6,650 at bats for a .271 career batting average along with 160 home runs, 758 runs batted in and a .360 on-base percentage. He ended his career with a .986 fielding percentage.

Coaching career and retirement

He served as a Yankee coach for three seasons in the mid-1980s before returning to the coaching staff at the start of 2004. He also spent time as the minor league hitting coach for the Oakland A's.

In 2002, he established The Roy White Foundation, a charity aimed to help children and young adults in the New York area who would like to attend college, but do not have the financial resources to do so.

White, who is African American, resurfaced in a 2011 interview for UniWatch on Page 2 of ESPN.com about his time with the Yankees Double-A during the mid-1960s, the Columbus Confederate Yankees, since the team had a patch of the Confederate flag on the team's uniforms at the height of the civil rights movement. White himself commented that he didn't notice the patch at the time nor paid attention to its symbolism, having to deal with overt racism in the Southern United States at the time.

In 2014, White receive a Special Recognition Award presented by the Order Sons of Italy in America, Columbus Lodge #2143 for his efforts to promote higher education to underprivileged students through the Roy White Foundation.

See also
List of Major League Baseball career stolen bases leaders
List of Major League Baseball annual runs scored leaders
List of Major League Baseball players who spent their entire career with one franchise

References

External links

Roy White st SABR (Baseball BioProject)
The Roy White Foundation Website Roy White's official homepage and charity

 
 

 
 

 
 

1943 births
Living people
Major League Baseball first base coaches
New York Yankees coaches
New York Yankees executives
New York Yankees scouts
Major League Baseball left fielders
American League All-Stars
New York Yankees players
Yomiuri Giants players
American expatriate baseball players in Japan
African-American baseball players
African-American baseball coaches
Baseball players from Los Angeles
Fort Lauderdale Yankees players
Greensboro Yankees players
Columbus Confederate Yankees players
Spokane Indians players
21st-century African-American people
20th-century African-American sportspeople